Podocarpus rumphii is a species of conifer in the family Podocarpaceae. It is found in China, Indonesia, Malaysia, Papua New Guinea, and the Philippines.

References

rumphii
Least concern plants
Taxonomy articles created by Polbot